Church of San Pedro Apóstol may refer to the following churches in Spain:

Church of San Pedro Apóstol (Camarma de Esteruelas)
Church of San Pedro Apóstol (Ribatejada)
Church of San Pedro Apóstol (Villacadima)
Church of San Pedro Apóstol (Vitoria)